Brinkburn was a weatherboard- and corrugated-iron-built railway station in Northumberland on the Rothbury Branch built to serve the Healy Coate Colliery to which it was linked by a two-mile aerial ropeway.

History

They also were permitted to build a short branch line to Cornhill. The North British Railway and the branch line became part of the London and North Eastern Railway in 1923. In September 1952 passenger services were withdrawn and the line closed in November 1963.

Constructed to serve a local colliery the station was poorly used, and was first downgraded to a halt, and then closed in 1963. All that survives of the station is the stationmaster's house.

References

External links
Brinkburn Station on Northumbrian Railways
Brinkburn Station on Disused Stations
Brinkburn Station on a navigable 1956 O. S. map
The line on RailScot

Disused railway stations in Northumberland
Former North British Railway stations
Railway stations in Great Britain opened in 1904
Railway stations in Great Britain closed in 1963
1904 establishments in England